Conrad Baden (31 August 1908 – 11 June 1989) was a Norwegian organist, composer, music educator, and music critic.
He had an extensive production of orchestral works, chamber music, vocal works and church music.

He is considered one of the most important Norwegian composers of the 20th century.

Biography

Studies
He received his first music lessons from his organist father who  died when Conrad was 17 years old and about to complete business school. He devoted himself to music and studied piano and organ with the local organist Daniel Hanssen. The young talent soon played to services and oratories.  19 years old, Baden was given organist position in Strømsgodset church.

Instead of studying at the Music Conservatory in Oslo, he proceeded to a private exam as organist in 1931 and with excellent grades. In 1931-32 he studied church music at the Leipzig Conservatory and got strong impressions of the Bach tradition. Fellow students were later Nidaros cathedral organist Ludvig Nielsen and composer Geirr Tveitt.

Coming home he studied counterpoint with Palestrina expert Per Steenberg and instrumentation and composition with the composer Bjarne Brustad.

Debut
In 1936 he gave his debut concert as an organist at the Oslo Cathedral. He eventually became known as an organist and composer of organ works, motets and hymns. During the 1950s Bden was a strong and radical voice amongst discussions concerning a departure from the late romantic style in favour of Lutheran and neobaroque style.

In 1943 he changed his organist position to his father's old church Strømsø in Drammen. In 1946 he appeared as a professional composer in Oslo with a chamber music program. In 1961 he moved with wife and two sons to Oslo and a position in Ris church until 1975. This concluded serving as an organist during 47 years.

Work styles

Neoclassicism of the 1950s
Baden's earliest works were penned in a national-romantic style, while his church music works display a close bond to the prevalent Palestrina style of the period. His works from 1950 onwards, were heavily influenced by French Neo-classicism, and in the 60s Baden would also employ twelve-tone techniques, with an increasing use of dissonance. Spring 1965 saw Baden travelling to Vienna to meet Hanns Jelinek, a student of Schönberg and Berg – a visit that led to a stylistic liberation for the Norwegian composer. The following year, this liberation came into fruition in his sole twelve-tone work Hymnus per alto, flauto, oboe e viola with a text from the Latin hymn Vexilla Regis.

A breakthrough as an orchestral composer came in 1955 with the performance of Symphony No. 1. A unique neoclassical work is the Fairytale Suite for Orchestra (1960), inspired by Norwegian traditional stories.

Modernism
In the 1960s, younger composers like Egil Hovland and Knut Nystedt pioneered a more radical tone language inspired by the twelve-tone technique. Baden had already in 1958 criticized "the gap between church music and concert music ..., a church ideal which, as time goes on, is increasingly distancing itself from the musical practice of the present".

Baden was himself influenced by the increasing radicalization of contemporary music. He began to use themes from the twelve-tone technique, and with a bolder use of dissonances. The need for a new orientation led in 1965 to studies in Vienna with Hanns Jelinek, a student of the twelve-tone pioneers Arnold Schönberg and Alban Berg. Despite experiencing him as "a terrible calculator," the visit contributed to a lasting stylistic liberation.

Composer
Baden composed works in a number of forms, bar opera and electronic music. As a composer, he was highly active. In addition to his vocation as a professional organist through 47 years, he composed a mass for soloists, choirs and orchestra, 200 songs for soloists and choirs, suites and sonatas for piano and other instruments, motets and 11 cantatas. In Baden's compositional output, his church music occupies an equal role to that of his orchestral works – he would write five concertos and smaller orchestral works as well as six symphonies.
In addition to his career in composition and as an organist, he taught counterpoint, harmony and composition at the Music Conservatory in Oslo. 
As a music critic, Baden's reviews were featured in newspapers Drammens Tidende, Vårt Land and Morgenbladet.

Compositions
While holding positions as an organist, music critic and educator, he composed 146 works in most forms. Among his 20 orchestral works are solo concerts for clarinet, viola, piano, bassoon and cello, and he composed six symphonies 1952 - 1980. 2)3)4)5)

Among choral works are a Mass (1949) with the classic Latin text and 11 cantatas for special occasions in cities and churches. Many Norwegian church choirs have sung some of his 45 motets for the service. Adaptations of Norwegian religious folk tones make up a large part of his numerous songs for choir and solo songs.

His 35 chamber music and piano works include suites and sonatas, also for children. Among his 33 organ works, there are 11 variations on folk tunes and on chorales. In free organ works such as sonatas (the first in 1939) and suites for organ, the tone language moves parallel  the development of contemporary music, from late romanticism through neoclassicism to expressionism. The suite Pezzi concertante (1966) is described by the organ performer Harald Herresthal as "expressive and almost volcanic emotional”. outburst"

The more radical tone language of the 1960s is evident in the orchestral work Variazioni (1963). There he tries out the twelve-tone style, and this is most strongly expressed in Hymnus for song and three instruments (1966). Such a sonic liberation combined with classical forms characterized him for the rest of his life, through the latter half of his total sixty years of compositional work. He is described as a stylistically diverse composer.

Educator and critic
From 1947 he was a teacher in counterpoint, harmony and composition at the Music Conservatory in Oslo. After a transition of the conservatory in 1973 to the Norwegian Academy of Music he served as an associate professor until 1978. He was central to theory teaching for thirty years. Among his numerous students are Harald Herresthal, Trond Kverno and Ragnar Söderlind.  Also students who wanted to compose differently than the traditional classical style, like Arne Nordheim and jazz musicians such as Jan Garbarek, had lessons in harmony and counterpoint (also called "Conrad point"!) with him.

Even if being a serious educator, he was known for his humour. Composition professor Finn Mortensen puts it this way: “Behind the smoking pipe and the serious features it hides an ability for unique punchlines and an ability for whimsical humming with a dry-whitish cut.”

He was a music critic in newspapers and magazines since 1935, and his commentaries give important response to Norwegian musical life through fifty years.

Selected works
Compositions not published are available in the National Library, Nasjonalbiblioteket

Orchestral works 
6 symphonies: nr. 1 1952, nr. 2 1957, nr. 3 Sinfonia piccolo 1959, nr. 4 1970, nr. 5 Sinfonia voluntatis 1976, nr. 6 Sinfonia espressiva 1980
Divertimento 1951
Ouvertura Gioia 1953
Pastorale e fuga 1958
Fairytale Suite 1960
Variazioni 1963
Fantasia breve 1965
Concerto per orchestra 1968
Intrada sinfonica 1969
Pastorale og rondo 1983

Concertos 
 Concertos for solo and orchestra
 Concertino for clarinet and strings 1954
 Concerto for viola and orchestra 1973
 Concerto for piano and orchestra 1979
 Concerto for bassoon and strings 1981
 Concerto for cello og orchestra 1986

Works for chorus, soloist and orchestra
 Mitt fedreland 1943. Text Ola Setrom
 Mass (latin) 1949
 Noregs dag 1966. Text  Per Sivle

Cantatas 
 Høyr kor kyrkjeklokka lokkar, choral cantata on a religious folk tune 1963
 A little Christmas Cantata, Puer natus 1965 Norsk Musikforlag
 Passion Cantata 1964 Norsk Musikforlag
 University Cantata 1971
 Cantatas for the Freemason lodge 1952 and 1981
 Cantata for the cities of Skien and Drammen 1957 and 1985
 Cantatas for the churches of Tangen, Strømsø and Drøbak, 1953, 1966 and 1974

Chorus with and without accompagnement, also congregational hymns
 Mixed choir SATB if not otherwise stated
 Four motets after Book of Psalms 1935-36. Norsk Musikforlag
 Nine hymns 1940-41 (Tenk når en gang/Eg veit ei hamn  Norwegian Hymnal)
 Ten religious folk tunes for male choir 1947 Lyche musikkforlag
 Five songs for male choir 1942-49 Norsk Notestik, Musikk-Huset og Lyche
 Thirteen choral songs 1940-51 Norsk Musikforlag og Musikk-Huset
 Two arrangements of folk tunes for  women's choir and organ 1962. Concordia
 Eight motets 1965 (Ikke enhver som sier. Lyche)
 Two songs and two motets for SAB 1964-67 (Fader jeg vil, Alle de som Faderen Lyche)
 Two choral arrangementes 1963-68 (O Herre Krist, Jeg vil meg Herren) Lyche
 Two Hamsun songs for male choir 1959-60 (Tonen. Lyche)
 Seven motets 1961-69 Østnorsk musikkforlag and Lyche
 Two motets for choir and organ (Psalm 150 and Se,Gud er min frelse) Norsk Musikforlag. Lyche
 Three church song for children's/women's choir 1953-70 (Ave Maria og Sanctus, Lyche)
 Seven Skjæraasensongs for children's/women's choir 1955-70 Lyche
 Four introitus for choir and organ 1964-70 (Stå opp, Vi er hans verk, I samme stund. Lyche)
 Two motets 1958-70 (Pange Lingua, Trøst mitt folk) Lyche
 Five Setrom-songs for male choir 1942-71 Norsk Musikforlag. Lyche
 To Spring songs for women's choir 1960-71 Tekst Vinje, Sande. Norsk Musikforlag. Lyche
 Four songs 1960-72 (Ja, Herre, eg høyrer. Norderval. Lunde forlag)
 Six arrangements of religious folk tunes 1958-75 Lyche
 Ten hymns 1979 (Som spede barnet Norwegian Hymnal )
 Thirteen hymns 1979 (Vi hilser din gjenkomst Norwegian Hymnal 1985)
 Herre ha takk, from Eight solo songs. Text Trygve Bjerkrheim. 1981
 Seven motets (1981-87 (Jeg er oppstandelsen, I fred) Norsk Musikforlag. Lyche
 Thirteen hymns. Text Svein Ellingsen 1983-88 (Døden må vike Norwegian Hymnal)
 Taubeana for mixed choir, baryton and piano. 1979. Potpourri on six songs by Evert Taube
 Sixteen songs 1971-89 (Lykken/Happiness for children's chorus Skjæraasen. 1971 Wilhelm 
 Hansen/Reimers. God Nat/Good Night Wergeland for children's chorus 1976. Lilja Aslaug Vaa, 1977, for women's chorus. Norsk Musikforlag

Chamber music 
 4 string quartets (nr. 1 1941, nr. 2 1943, nr. 3 1961, nr. 4 1983)
 Sonata for violin and piano 1941
 Piano Trio 1947
 Alla marcia, from Little suite for piano 1947, arr. for 11 wind instruments. E. Gamm Musikverlag, Bochum
 Trio for flute, obo and clarinet 1957 Lyche
 Flute sonata (solo) 1957 Norsk Musikforlag
 Elegie for violin and organ 1960 Lyche
 Wind quintet no 1 1963, no 2 1982
 Wind trio no 2 (Divertimento) for flute, obo and clarinet 1964
 Hymnus (Vexilla regis) for alto, flute, oboe and viola 1966 Norsk Musikforlag
 Clarinet quintet 1971
 Fantasi boreale for cello and piano 1974
 Partita folk tune Now the day is over, for brass sextett 1975. Norsk Musikforlag
 Mini-trio for flute, clarinet and bassoon 1977
 Sonata nr. 1 for obo and organ 1978
 Sonata for bass clarinet and piano 1978
 Two movements for violin and organ 1983 (with Elegie 1960 Sonata)
 Sonata for flute and piano 1984
 Pezzi sentimento per violincello 1984
 Dialogues for two clarinets 1984
 Sonata nr. 2 for obo og keyboard 1985

Piano
 Little suite 1947 Preludium.Vals.Fughetta.Vise. Alla marcia
 Scherzo 1957 Pro Piano hefte 3 Lyche
 10 small pieces for children. 1963. Lyche
 Three piano pieces 1964. Preludium, Aria, Scherzo
 Ten small pieces for piano. For education 1967. Norsk Musikforlag
 10 Bagatelles for piano 1971. Norsk Musikforlag
 Choral partita nr. 5 for keyboard, folk tune I himmelen 1975 Norsk Musikforlag
 Suite for piano 1976 Preludio. Tema con variazioni. Intermezzo. Toccata.
 Variazioni libere 1979

Organ
 Passacaglia 1930
 Choral partita no 1 Christ lag in Todesbanden 1936 Norsk Notestik
 Sonata b-minor 1939. Cantando
 Phantay and fugue St. Olav-song Ljoset yver landet dagna 1939
 Three choral preludes 1946 In collection 28 koralforspill av norske organister. Norsk Musikforlag
 Toccata, choral and fugue St. Olav-song Lux illuxit 1946 Lyche
 Four chorale preludes Våkn op. Kom hit. Gud skal allting lage. Sørg, o kjære Fader 1949 Lyche
 Prelude, pastorale and chaconne 1951 Nordiska Musikförlaget, in Musica Organi III
 Five organ chorales. Melodies by L.M.Lindeman 1955 Lyche
 Sonatina 1956
 Toccata, choral and fugue religious folk tune Korset vil jeg aldri svike 1957 Lyche
 Choral partita nr. 2 Macht hoch die Tür 1960. Cantando
 Organ book from Strømsø church 56 organ chorales and chorale preludes 1943-60
 Twelve organ chorales on Norwegian folk tunes 1958-61 Lyche
 Two organ works for advent 1958-63 (Toccata Konge er du visst Cantando)
 Pezzi concertante, suite. Preludio. Pastorale. Tema con variationi. Fuga. 1966. Norsk Musikforlag
 Nuptial intrada nr. 1 Kjærlighet er lysets kilde 1969 Vest-Norsk, in Norwegian Processional Music
 Choral partita nr. 3 O Lamm Gottes 1972 Cantando
 Choral partita nr. 4 religious folk tune Jeg ser deg O Guds lam 1972. Norsk Musikforlag
 Sonata sacra 1974. For Maria Church, Bergen.
 Choral partita nr. 5 for keyboard, folk tune I himmelen 1975 Norsk Musikforlag
 Organ book from Ris church 1961-75 Ca. 750 organ chorales and choral preludes. Selections in 
 Musikkhuset (50 Organ chorales) and Cantando-Permen
 Suite boreale. Introduksjon. Toccata. Interludium. Passacaglia. 1976
 Chorale partita nr. 6 Jeg løfter opp til Gud min sang 1976. Noton-Cantando
 Sonata nr.1 for obo and organ 1978 
 Sonata rigorosa (Organ sonata nr. 3) 1978
 Choral phantasy Grosser Gott, wir loben dich 1980 Cantando
 Sonata al festo (Organ sonata nr. 4) 1984
 Sonata nr. 2 for obo and keyboard 1985
 Nuptial intrada nr. 2 1984. Cantando in Jubilate nr.2

Solo songs
 Eleven songs 1930-35 
 To Norwegian songs and Lilja. 1942 Text Aslaug Vaa. Lyche 
 Four songs 1942.Text Henrik Rytter. Lyche 
 Four Setrom songs 1942 
 To Edda-poems 1942-44 
 Four songs 1942-44 Text Anna-Lisa Jörstad 
 Four biblical songs for solo and organ. Gospel of John 1945-60 
 Nine songs 1953-69 Text Wergeland, Aukrust, Obstfelder, Hamsun and others. 
 Lykken (Happiness) 1971 Text Skjæraasen  
 Two Fröding-songs for barytone og piano (En vintervisa, En vårfästmö) 1972 
 Four  Skjæraasen songs (Sinn, Norsk salme, Sang på elva, Gjenskinn)1972 Norsk Musikforlag (In 6 Songs) 
 Two biblical songs for soprano, oboe and organ (Til deg Herre, Jeg vil glede meg) 1975 
 Fourteen religious folk tunes 1963-75 (I dag er nådens tid og Gå varlig. Concordia) 
 Four solo motets. Gospel of John 1966-76 
 God nat (Good night) 1976. Text Wergeland.  Barnesalmeboka Verbum-IKO 
 Three songs (Di makt, Bruheim. Fødd i går, H. M. Vesaas. August, Skjæraasen) 1979  
 Norsk Musikforlag (In 6 Songs) 
 Three solo motets for deep voice (Søk Herren, Drag inn, Fariseeren og tolderen) 1980 
 Eight songs Text Trygve Bjerkrheim 1981-82 (Takk for den Heilage Ande! /Thank The Holy Spirit) 
 Old Maria Song, arrangement 1982. Norsk Musikforlag (In 6 Songs)  
 Four biblical songs for deep voice, Book of Psalms 1983-85

3 melodies in Norwegian Hymnal 2013
 868 Eg veit ei hamn (Original Tenk når engang) 1941 Text Bjarne Rabben
 576 Som spede barnet 1979 Text Britt G. Hallqvist
 209 Døden må vike 1983 Text Svein Ellingsen

Discography

Orchestra
 Concertino for clarinet and strings Philips 1972. Simax 2008 PSC 1802. CD GRONG GMP  2010.
 Pastorale and fuge for chamber orchestra  Simax 2008 PSC 1802
 Fairytale Suite Simax 2008 PSC 1802
 Variazioni. Simax 2008 PSC 1802
 Fantasia breve. Philips 1978
 Intrada sinfonica. Philips 1972. Simax 2008 PSC 1802
 Piano concerto. Simax 2008 PSC 1802
 Sinfonia espressiva, nr. 6. Norwegian composers 1983 and Norsk musikkproduksjon 1988

Chamber music
 Wind trio nr. 1. Philips 1967. Norwegian composers 1983
 Flute sonata, solo  Norsk komponistforening 1986
 Hymnus for song and three instruments Kirkelig kulturverksted 1978. Lawo 2020
 Clarinet quintet Philips 1980
 Suite for piano. Norwegian composers 1983
 Sonata nr. 1 for oboe and organ. Kirkelig kulturverksted 1978
 Sonata for bass clarinet and piano. Norsk musikkproduksjon 1989/2002
 Variationi libere for piano. Norwegian composers 1983

Organ
 Toccata, choral and fuge folk tune Korset vil jeg aldri svike. Philips 1969. Vest-Norsk Plateselskap 2005
 From Twelve organ chorales on folk tunes. Rogalyd/PaVi  2000 
 Pezzi concertante. Norwegian Composers 1976
 Chorale partita nr. 4on folk tune Jeg ser deg O Guds lam Norwegian Composers 1977 og 2014. 
 Chorale partita nr. 5 for keyboard, folk tune I himmelen. Hamar domkirke 2012
 Chorale partita nr. 6 Jeg løfter opp til Gud min sang. Varese 1983 VS-84002

Vocal music
 Nuptial Hymn for choir Lu-mi 1975
 Norwegian song, Eg er’kje eismal for solo and piano. Nor-Disc 1970
 Religious folk tune Mitt hjerte alltid vanker for male choir Eton 1972
 A little Christmas Cantata Puer natus 1965 Norsk Musikforlag.  Kirkelig kulturverksted 1978
 Psalm 150. MLLP Nidaros domkirke 1986
 Sanctus for children's choir. HMV-EMI 1970
 Introitus for choir and organ. Kirkelig Kulturverksted 1975
 Pange lingua, motet Kirkelig kulturverksted 1978
 Trøst mitt folk, motet. Kirkelig kulturverksted 1978
 Sus, sunnanvind for male choir. Cantio 1994
 Ja, Herre, eg høyrer for choir. Lynor 1975
 Skjæraasen songs for solo and piano. Norwegian Composers 1983.
 Two biblical songs Kirkelig kulturverksted 1978
 Religious folksongs for song and piano/organ. Lu-mi 1973
 Three solomotets Gospel St. John, Hamnes DSH02 2012
 Three solo songs. Norwegian Composers 1983. Euridice 2008
 Herre ha takk/Thank The Holy Spirit for song and organ Lynor 1984
 Vaarkjenning for women's choir. Varese 1983

Literature
 Aurdal, Gunnar Sigve 2007 Paul Hindemiths påverknad på norske etterkrigskomponistar- Finn Mortensen, Egil Hovland, Conrad Baden. dissertation       University of Oslo. www.duo.uio.no/bitstream/handle/10852/27144/Masteroppgave.pdf?sequence=1&isAllowed=y
 Baden, Torkil 1977 Conrad Baden. Norske komponister, red. Kjell Bækkelund. Tiden
 Baden, Torkil 1977 Conrad Badens komposisjoner. Dissertation University of Oslo
 Baden, Torkil 1979 Fantasia breve per orchestra og Conrad Badens symfoniske stil. Studia Musicologica.Yearbook Oslo University Press
 Baden, Torkil 1995 Baden: organist-komponist. Toner i tusen år - en norsk kirkemusikkhistorie. Verbum
 Baden, Torkil 2020 Conrad Baden - komponist, kirkemusiker, konservatorielærer og kritiker. Biografi med verkliste. (with list of works) https://www.hf.uio.no/imv/forskning/prosjekter/norgesmusikk/musikkhistarkiv/publikasjoner/baden_conrad_biografi_verker.pdf
 Grinde; Nils 1981: Conrad Baden, i Norsk musikkhistorie
 Herresthal, Harald 1972 Kirkemusikeren og komponisten Conrad Baden. Norsk musikktidsskrift 1971 nr, 2,3 og 4, 1972 nr. 1
 Herresthal, Harald 2008 Orchestral works by Conrad Baden. Liner notes  Simax PSC 1802, 2008, in English
 Nesheim, Elef 2009 Conrad Baden, Norsk biografisk leksikon.  https://nbl.snl.no/Conrad_Baden

National Library of Norway has collected sheet music, critics, programmes and other documents after Conrad Baden.

References

{Elef Nesheim Norsk biografisk leksikon>1 "En av 1900-tallets betydeligste norske komponister"

^ Elef Nesheim (1985) History of Music (translated):  “The symphonies represent the stylistic development of Baden. He has always held on to a tonal basis and builds on the classic forms. The sonic element has gained an increasingly prominent place in a very expanded tonality.”2

^ Grinde, Nils (1981). History of Norwegian Music (translated) “Throughout most of his production there is a strong sense of musically balanced form and a solid textural technique with a main emphasis on polyphony. Though mainly composing in  neoclassical tradition, he is occasionally experimenting. On the whole, solidity is a trait that one would gladly associate with Baden’ music.» 3

^ Harald Herresthal in Aftenposten. «here is a summing up of a lifetime of craftmanship and musical experiences in an elaborate and solidly molded work»4

^ Jarle Søraa in Verdens Gang: «one of the finest symphonies i Norwegian contemporary music ever» 5

External links
List of Works supplied by the National Library of Norway

1908 births
1989 deaths
20th-century classical composers
20th-century Norwegian composers
20th-century Norwegian writers
Norwegian classical composers
Norwegian classical organists
Male classical organists
Norwegian music critics
Norwegian music educators
20th-century organists
20th-century Norwegian male musicians